Gun Talk is the fifth album by old school hip hop/hardcore MC Just-Ice. It was released in 1993, and it was the only album of his to have major-label distribution.

Track listing
 "Gangster Style Rap"  – 3:13
 "Girls N' Guns"  – 4:34
 "It's a Just-Ice Thing"  – 3:32
 "Freestyle"  – 5:48
 "Give Mi Pas"  – 3:52
 "Bring ’Em Back Alive"  – 4:14
 "That the Way I Feel"  – 4:59
 "Stay the Hell Away from Me"  – 4:00
 "Informer Fi Dead"  – 5:32
 "On the Loose"  – 5:11

Charts

References

External links
 [ Gun Talk] at AllMusic

1993 albums
Just-Ice albums
Albums produced by Kurtis Mantronik